This is a list of the largest cities in Canada by census starting with the 1871 census of Canada, the first national census. Only communities that were incorporated as cities at the time of each census are presented. Therefore, this list does not include any incorporated towns that may have been larger than any incorporated cities at each census.

1871

1881

1891

1901

1911 
Source: Canada Year Book 1932

1921 
Cities west of Ontario take up four of the top ten spots in this census. Many Western cities will grow quickly during the 20th century, in large part, because they are able to expand their borders.  Source: Canada Year Book 1932

1931 
Source: Canada Year Book 1932

1941 
Source: Canada Year Book 1955

1951 
Source: Canada Year Book 1955

1956 
Source: Canada Year Book 1957-58

1961 
Source: Canada Year Book 1967

1966 
Source: 1966 Census of Canada - Population (Dominion Bureau of Statistics)

1971 
Source: Canada Year Book 1972

1976 
Source: 1976 Census of Canada - Population (Statistics Canada)

1981 
Though Winnipeg's population more than doubled in large part to amalgamation of its surrounding municipalities, a number of Canadian cities suffered population losses during the 1970s. Source: Canada Year Book 1988

1986 
Source: Government of Canada Publications

1991 
Source : Statistics Canada Community Profiles: Census 1991

1996 
Source: Georef 1996 Census

2001 
A wave of amalgamations took place in Ontario during the 1990s and 2000s that affected city population figures.

2006
The wave of amalgamations extended into the province of Quebec: in 2002, both Montreal and Quebec City combined with a number of smaller surrounding cities, some of which later chose to leave the amalgamation. Source : Statistics Canada Community Profiles: Census 2006

2011

2016

2021

See also

Census in Canada
List of the largest cities and towns in Canada by area
List of the largest municipalities in Canada by population
List of the largest population centres in Canada
Population of Canada by province and territory
Population of Canada by year

References 

Censuses in Canada
Canada municipalities
Cities